Mudasir Ali (born 21 November 1987) is an Indian composer. He debuted as a film composer in 2015 by composing songs and film score for the movie Bumper Draw. He later scored music for an action-thriller Four Pillars of Basement.

Career

Original scores and songs 
In 2014, Mudasir Ali rendered vocals for the title song of Girish Malik's Jal along with veteran Shubha Mudgal. The film was selected for the Panorama Selection of International Film Festival of India. His Indo Pak album Dil ki Udan Sarhad ke paar hai was launched by Mahesh Bhatt. He has also performed duets with Shubha Mudgal in a Bikram Ghosh project. He has recorded a song with Asha Bhosle for the film Lucknow Times.

Discography

Awards 
Mudasir Ali was nominated for 'Upcoming Music composer of the year' for his song in Lucknow Times at the San Francisco International Film Festival.

References

External links 
 
 

1987 births
Indian male film score composers
Living people
Bollywood playback singers
Indian film score composers
Indian male playback singers